Pam Ward is an on-air personality for the cable sports television network ESPN, serving as one of the play-by-play announcers for ESPN's coverage of the 2012 and 2013 Women's College World Series of Softball.

She is a graduate of the University of Maryland, College Park with a degree in communications.

Prior to ESPN, Ward worked as an anchor/host for WTEM between April 1992 and March 1995 and then WBAL between March 1995 and 1996.

In 2000, Ward became the first woman to perform play-by-play announcing for an NCAA football nationally televised game.

References

External links
Biography from ESPN.com

Living people
American television sports announcers
American sports radio personalities
College basketball announcers in the United States
College football announcers
University of Maryland, College Park alumni
Women sports announcers
Women's National Basketball Association announcers
Women's college basketball announcers in the United States
Softball announcers
Year of birth missing (living people)